Jelly Jamm is an animated children's television series created by Carlos L. Del Rey, Victor M. Lopez and David Cantolla.

Series overview

Episodes

Season 1

Season 2

Lists of British animated television series episodes
Lists of Spanish animated television series episodes

hu:Jelly Jamm#Epizódok
pl:Jelly Jamm#Spis odcinków
ro:Jelly Jamm#Episoade